Super Moon is the seventh studio album by American reggae rock band Dirty Heads, released on August 9, 2019.

History
On June 14, 2019, Dirty Heads released "Super Moon", the first single and title track of their new album.

On July 5, the second single "Lift Me Up" was released.

Track listing

Charts

References

2019 albums
Dirty Heads albums
Five Seven Music albums